The dechristianization of France during the French Revolution is a conventional description of the results of a number of separate policies conducted by various governments of France between the start of the French Revolution in 1789 and the Concordat of 1801, forming the basis of the later and less radical laïcité policies. The aim of the campaign between 1790 and 1794 ranged from the appropriation by the government of the great landed estates and the large amounts of money held by the Gallican Church (the Roman Catholic Church in France) to the termination of Christian religious practice and of the religion itself. There has been much scholarly debate over whether the movement was popularly motivated.

The French Revolution initially began with attacks on Church corruption and the wealth of the higher clergy, an action with which even many Christians could identify, since the Gallican Church held a dominant role in pre-revolutionary France. During a two-year period known as the Reign of Terror, the episodes of anti-clericalism grew more violent than any in modern European history. The new revolutionary authorities suppressed the Church, abolished the Catholic monarchy, nationalized Church property, exiled 30,000 priests, and killed hundreds more.  In October 1793, the Christian calendar was replaced with one reckoned from the date of the Revolution, and Festivals of Liberty, Reason, and the Supreme Being were scheduled.  New forms of moral religion emerged, including the deistic Cult of the Supreme Being and the atheistic Cult of Reason, with the revolutionary government briefly mandating observance of the former in April 1794.

Religion and the Catholic Church under the monarchy

Before 1789
In 18th-century France, the vast majority of the population adhered to the Catholic Church as Catholicism had been since the revocation of the Edict of Nantes in 1685 the only religion officially allowed in the kingdom. Nonetheless, minorities of French Protestants (mostly Huguenots & German Lutherans in Alsace) and Jews still lived in France at the beginning of the Revolution. The Edict of Versailles, commonly known as the Edict of Tolerance, had been signed by Louis XVI on 7 November 1787 did not give non-Catholics in France the right to openly practice their religions but only the rights to legal and civil status, which included the right to contract marriages without having to convert to the Catholic faith. At the same time, libertine thinkers popularized atheism and anti-clericalism.

The Ancien Régime institutionalised the authority of the clergy in its status as the First Estate of the realm. As the largest landowner in the country, the Catholic Church controlled properties which provided massive revenues from its tenants; the Church also had an enormous income from the collection of tithes. Since the Church kept the registry of births, deaths, and marriages and was the only institution that provided hospitals and education in some parts of the country, it influenced all citizens.

Between 1789 and 1792

A milestone event of the Revolution was the abolition of the privileges of the First and Second Estate on the night of 4 August 1789. In particular, it abolished the tithes gathered by the Catholic clergy.

The Declaration of the Rights of Man and of the Citizen of 1789 proclaimed freedom of religion across France in these terms:

On 10 October 1789, the National Constituent Assembly seized the properties and land held by the Catholic Church and decided to sell them as assignats.

On 12 July 1790, the assembly passed the Civil Constitution of the Clergy that subordinated the Catholic Church in France to the French government. It was never accepted by the Pope and other high-ranking clergy in Rome.

Fall of the monarchy in 1792

New policies of the revolutionary authorities
The programme of dechristianization waged against Catholicism, and eventually against all forms of Christianity, included:

 destruction of statues, plates and other iconography from places of worship
 destruction of crosses, bells and other external signs of worship
 the institution of revolutionary and civic cults, including the Cult of Reason and subsequently the Cult of the Supreme Being (spring 1794)
 the enactment of a law on 21 October 1793 making all nonjuring priests and all persons who harbored them liable to death on sight

An especially notable event that took place in the course of France’s dechristianization was the Festival of Reason, which was held in Notre Dame Cathedral on 10 November 1793.

The dechristianization campaign can be seen as the logical extension of the materialist philosophies of some leaders of the Enlightenment such as Voltaire, while for others with more prosaic concerns it provided an opportunity to unleash resentments against the Catholic Church (in the spirit of conventional anti-clericalism) and its clergy.

The Revolution and the Church

In August 1789, the State cancelled the taxing power of the Church. The issue of Church property became central to the policies of the new revolutionary government. Declaring that all Church property in France belonged to the nation, confiscations were ordered and Church properties were sold at public auction. In July 1790, the National Constituent Assembly published the Civil Constitution of the Clergy that stripped clerics of their special rights—the clergy were to be made employees of the state, elected by their parish or bishopric, and the number of bishoprics was to be reduced—and required all priests and bishops to swear an oath of fidelity to the new order or face dismissal, deportation or death.

French priests had to receive Papal approval to sign such an oath, and Pius VI spent almost eight months deliberating on the issue. On 13 April 1791, the Pope denounced the Constitution, resulting in a split in the French Catholic Church. Over fifty percent became abjuring priests ("jurors"), also known as "constitutional clergy", and nonjuring priests as "refractory clergy".

In September 1792, the Legislative Assembly legalized divorce, contrary to Catholic doctrine. At the same time, the State took control of the birth, death, and marriage registers away from the Church. An ever-increasing view that the Church was a counter-revolutionary force exacerbated the social and economic grievances and violence erupted in towns and cities across France.

In Paris, over a forty-eight-hour period beginning on 2 September 1792, as the Legislative Assembly (successor to the National Constituent Assembly) dissolved into chaos, three Church bishops and more than two hundred priests were massacred by angry mobs; this constituted part of what would become known as the September Massacres. Priests were among those drowned in mass executions (noyades) for treason under the direction of Jean-Baptiste Carrier; priests and nuns were among the mass executions at Lyons, for separatism, on the orders of Joseph Fouché and Collot d'Herbois. Hundreds more priests were imprisoned and made to suffer in abominable conditions in the port of Rochefort.

Anti-Church laws were passed by the Legislative Assembly and its successor, the National Convention, as well as by département councils throughout the country. Many of the acts of dechristianization in 1793 were motivated by the seizure of Church gold and silver to finance the war effort.  In November 1793, the département council of Indre-et-Loire abolished the word dimanche. The Gregorian calendar, an instrument decreed by  Pope Gregory XIII in 1582, was replaced by the French Republican Calendar which abolished the sabbath, saints' days and any references to the Church. The seven-day week became ten days instead. It soon became clear, however, that nine consecutive days of work were too much, and that international relations could not be carried out without reverting to the Gregorian system, which was still in use everywhere outside of France. Consequently, the Gregorian Calendar was reimplemented in 1795.

Anti-clerical parades were held, and the Archbishop of Paris, Jean-Baptiste-Joseph Gobel, was forced to resign his duties and made to replace his mitre with the red "Cap of Liberty". Street and place names with any sort of religious connotation were changed, such as the town of St. Tropez, which became Héraclée. Religious holidays were banned and replaced with holidays to celebrate the harvest and other non-religious symbols. Many churches were converted into "temples of reason", in which Deistic services were held. Local people often resisted this dechristianisation and forced members of the clergy who had resigned to conduct Mass again. Maximilien Robespierre and the Committee of Public Safety denounced the dechristianizers as foreign enemies of the Revolution, and established their own new religion. This Cult of the Supreme Being, without the alleged "superstitions" of Catholicism, supplanted both Catholicism and the rival Cult of Reason.  Both new religions were short-lived. Just six weeks before his arrest, on 8 June 1794, the still-powerful Robespierre personally led a vast procession through Paris to the Tuileries garden in a ceremony to inaugurate the new faith. His execution occurred shortly afterward, on 28 July 1794.

By early 1795 a return to some form of religion-based faith was beginning to take shape and a law passed on 21 February 1795 legalized public worship, albeit with strict limitations. The ringing of church bells, religious processions and displays of the Christian cross were still forbidden.

As late as 1799, priests were still being imprisoned or deported to penal colonies. Persecution only worsened after the French army led by General Louis Alexandre Berthier captured Rome in early 1798, declared a new Roman Republic, and also imprisoned Pope Pius VI, who would die in captivity in Valence, France in August 1799. However, after Napoleon seized control of the government in late 1799, France entered into year-long negotiations with new Pope Pius VII, resulting in the Concordat of 1801. This formally ended the dechristianization period and established the rules for a relationship between the Catholic Church and the French State.

Victims of the Reign of Terror totaled somewhere between 20,000 and 40,000. According to one estimate, among those condemned by the revolutionary tribunals about 8 percent were aristocrats, 6 percent clergy, 14 percent middle class, and 70 percent were workers or peasants accused of hoarding, evading the draft, desertion, rebellion, and other purported crimes. Of these social groupings, the clergy of the Catholic Church suffered proportionately the greatest loss.

Anti-Church laws were passed by the Legislative Assembly and its successor, the National Convention, as well as by département councils throughout the country. The Concordat of 1801 endured for more than a century until it was abrogated by the government of the Third Republic, which established a policy of laïcité on 11 December 1905.

Toll on the Church
Under threat of death, imprisonment, military conscription, and loss of income, about twenty thousand constitutional priests were forced to abdicate and hand over their letters of ordination, and six thousand to nine thousand of them agreed or were coerced to marry. Many abandoned their pastoral duties altogether. Nonetheless, some of those who had abdicated continued covertly to minister to the people.

By the end of the decade, approximately thirty thousand priests had been forced to leave France, and several hundred who did not leave were executed. Most French parishes were left without the services of a priest and deprived of the sacraments. Any non-juring priest faced the guillotine or deportation to French Guiana.  By Easter 1794, few of France's forty thousand churches remained open; many had been closed, sold, destroyed, or converted to other uses.

Victims of revolutionary violence, whether religious or not, were popularly treated as Christian martyrs, and the places where they were killed became pilgrimage destinations.  Catechising in the home, folk religion, syncretic and heterodox practices all became more common. The long-term effects on religious practice in France were significant. Many who were dissuaded from their traditional religious practices never resumed them.

Gallery

See also
 Persecution of Christians
 Christianity in France
 People engaged in the campaign: Jacques Hébert, Pierre Gaspard Chaumette, Joseph Fouché

Notes and references

Further reading

In English
 Aston, Nigel. Religion and Revolution in France, 1780-1804 (Catholic University of America Press, 2000), pp 259–76
 Byrnes, Joseph F. Priests of the French Revolution: Saints and Renegades in a New Political Era (2014)
 
 
 Furet, François and Mona Ozouf, eds. A Critical Dictionary of the French Revolution (1989), pp 21–32
 Gliozzo, Charles A. "The Philosophes and Religion: Intellectual Origins of the Dechristianization Movement in the French Revolution". Church History (1971) 40#3
 
 Kley, Dale K. Van.  The Religious Origins of the French Revolution: From Calvin to the Civil Constitution, 1560-1791 (1996)
 Lewis, Gwynne. Life in Revolutionary France. London : New York : Batsford; Putnam, 1972. 
 McManners, John.  The French Revolution and the Church (Greenwood Press, 1969) . 
 
 Tackett, Timothy. Religion, Revolution, and Regional Culture in Eighteenth-Century France: The Ecclesiastical Oath of 1791 (1986)

In French
 La Gorce, Pierre de,  Histoire Religieuse de la Révolution Française. 10. éd. Paris : Plon-Nourrit, 1912– 5 v.
 Langlois, Claude, Timothy Tackett, Michel Vovelle and S. Bonin. Atlas de la Révolution française. Religion, 1770-1820, tome 9 (1996)

External links
Chief clauses of the Civil Constitution of the Clergy

 
History of Catholicism in France
Anti-Catholicism in France
Anti-clericalism
Human rights abuses in France
Secularism in France
18th-century Christianity
Antitheism
Persecution of Catholics
Persecution of Christians
Christianization